Project Houdini is a computer program used by the 2008 U.S. presidential campaign of Barack Obama. Although it originally had missteps, it has been credited with helping increase Democratic Party turnout over the 2004 election. It has been compared to ORCA, which failed under similar circumstances for the Mitt Romney's 2012 presidential campaign.

See also

 Cambridge Analytica
 Catalist
 Contingency table
 Data dredging
 The Groundwork
 Project Narwhal
 Psychographic
 Predictive Analytics

References

Barack Obama
2008 United States presidential campaigns
Political campaign techniques
Mobile software
Software projects
2008 software
Analytics